The Netherlands competed at the 1996 Summer Olympics in Atlanta, United States.

Medalists

Archery

The Dutch archery team included former Soviet Union archer Lyudmila Arzhannikova.  She placed 15th for the Netherlands in Atlanta.

Athletics

Men
Track & road events

Field events

Combined events - Decathlon

Women
Track & road events

Field events

Badminton

Baseball

The Netherlands made its first Olympic baseball appearance in 1996.  They defeated Australia and Italy but lost their other five games in the preliminary round.  When this result put the Dutch team in a three-way tie for fifth through seventh place with Australia and Italy, the head-to-head victories gave the Netherlands fifth place.

Team roster

 Johnny Balentina
 Giel ten Bosch
 Eric de Bruin
 Peter Callenbach
 Rob Cordemans
 Jeffrey Cranston
 Eddie Dix
 Marlon Fluonia
 Evert-Jan 't Hoen
 Eelco Jansen

 Marcel Joost
 Adonis Kemp
 Geoffrey Kohl
 Marcel Kruijt
 André Maris
 Edsel Martis
 Paul Nanne
 Tom Nanne
 Byron Ward
 Danny Wout

Results

Canoeing

Slalom
Men

Cycling

Road competition
Men

Women

Track competition
Points race

Sprint

Pursuit

Time trial

Mountain bike

Equestrian

Dressage

Show jumping

Judo

Men

Women

Rowing

Men

Women

Sailing

Men

Women

Open
Fleet racing

Mixed racing

Shooting

Softball

Summary

Team roster
Madelon Beek
Petra Beek
Lucienne Geels
Jacqueline de Heer
Marjolein de Jong
Jacqueline Knol
Anita Kossen
Anouk Mels
Sandra Nieuwveen
Penny le Noble
Corrine Ockhuijsen
Sonja Pannen
Marlies van der Putten
Gonny Reijnen
Martine Stiemer
 Head coach: Ruud Elfers

Swimming

Men

Key: * - Swimmer competed in the heat but not the final; FA – Qualify to A final (medal); FB – Qualify to B final (non-medal)

Women

Key: * - Swimmer competed in the heat but not the final; FA – Qualify to A final (medal); FB – Qualify to B final (non-medal)

Table tennis

Tennis

Men

Women

Volleyball

Beach

Indoor
Summary

Men

 Team roster
 Peter Blangé
 Bas van de Goor
 Mike van de Goor
 Rob Grabert
 Henk-Jan Held
 Guido Görtzen
 Misha Latuhihin
 Olof van der Meulen
 Jan Posthuma
 Brecht Rodenburg
 Richard Schuil
 Ron Zwerver
 Head coach: Joop Alberda

Women

 Team roster
 Cintha Boersma
 Erna Brinkman
 Riëtte Fledderus
 Jerine Fleurke
 Marjolein de Jong
 Saskia van Hintum
 Elles Leferink
 Irena Machovcak
 Claudia van Thiel
 Lisette van der Ven
 Ingrid Visser
 Henriëtte Weersing
 Head coach: Bert Goedkoop

Water polo

Men's team competition
Summary

Team roster
Arie van de Bunt
Gert de Groot
Arno Havenga
Koos Issard
Bas de Jong
Niels van der Kolk
Marco Kunz
Harry van der Meer
Hans Nieuwenburg
Joeri Stoffels
Eelco Uri
Wyco de Vries
Hans van Zeeland (Head Coach)

References

 
 

Nations at the 1996 Summer Olympics
1996
S